Lost Echoes is a 2007 crime/mystery novel by American author Joe R. Lansdale. It was first printed as a limited edition and trade hardcover by Subterranean Press. It was later reissued as a trade paperback by Vintage Crime/Black Lizard publications.  The Subterranean editions have long since sold out.

Plot summary
Since a mysterious childhood illness Harry Wilkes has experienced horrific visions of gruesome murders and other horrible scenes. In college Harry turns to alcohol to suppress the visions and deal with the enormous stress that comes with it. One night at a bar he witnesses a fellow drunk easily fending off three would–be muggers. The man, whose name is Tad, turns out to be a student and expert of the martial arts. Harry strikes up a friendship with Tad who later becomes his sensei and teaches him to master his unusual gift. Soon a woman Harry had a crush on in his childhood comes asking him to help solve her father's murder. Unsure of how this will affect him, Harry and Tad find themselves involved in a horrible crime and murder. The question is will Harry's ability help him cope with the situation or contribute to his downfall.

References

Sources
What's That Sound?, Esquire magazine, February 28, 2007
Lost Echoes by Joe R. Lansdale – review, Spinetingler magazine, December 14, 2010
Lost Echoes (starred review), Publishers Weekly, February 1, 2007

External links
Author's Official Website
Subterranean Press Website
Vintage Crime/Black Lizard Website

Novels by Joe R. Lansdale
American mystery novels

2007 American novels
Novels set in Texas
Works by Joe R. Lansdale
Subterranean Press books